Freeseer is a cross-platform screencasting application suite released as free and open-source software. Freeseer is a project of the Free and Open Source Software Learning Centre (FOSSLC), a not-for-profit organization.

Its primary purpose is conference recording and has been used at conferences like OSGeo's FOSS4G, FSOSS, and more.

The software renders videos in an Ogg format. Its video source options are USB (e.g. internal/external webcam) or desktop. Freeseer consists of three different dependent programs: a recording tool (which is the main tool), a configuration tool, and a talk-list editor.

History 
Since 2008, FOSSLC has been recording open source events around the world. To reduce recording costs, gain more control over the recordings, and achieve a more portable recording solution, FOSSLC began investigating alternatives and in-house options.

In 2009, Freeseer was developed to make recording video extremely easy. Its primary goal was to make recording large conferences with many talks possible on a frugal budget and ensure recordings are high quality. Freeseer began as a proof of concept when a command line hack using strictly open source components was used to record video from a vga2usb device and audio from a microphone.

Features 
 Video & audio recording
 Video & audio streaming (RTMP streaming support and Justin.tv plug-in)
 Configuration tool
 Talk editor for managing talks to be recorded
 Uses a plug-in system so developers can easily add new features
 Supports basic keyboard shortcuts
 Configuration profiles
 Report editor for reporting issues with recorded talks
 Multiple audio input
 YouTube uploader

See also 

 Comparison of screencasting software

References

External links
 
 Freeseer Releases (contains packages for recent versions)
 Freeseer Downloads (contains binaries for older versions)

Software that uses GStreamer
Free software programmed in Python
Free video software
Screencasting software
Streaming software
Software that uses Qt
Portable software
Cross-platform software